Saikano is a Japanese animated television series that aired on Family Gekijou channel from July 2 – September 24, 2002.

Episode list

References

External links

Saikano
Episodes